Maryland v. Garrison, 480 U.S. 79 (1986), is a United States Supreme Court case dealing with the Fourth Amendment of the United States Constitution and the extent of discretion given to police officers acting in good faith. The Court held that where police reasonably believe their warrant was valid during a search, execution of the warrant does not violate respondent's Fourth Amendment rights.

Facts
The Baltimore Police Department were executing a warrant that said the ‘3rd floor apartment’ intending to search McWebbs apartment, when the police went upstairs they searched the 3rd floor and found drugs and cash.  The police, then discovered that the 3rd floor was actually divided into 2 apartments.  Up to that point none of the police had realized there were 2 distinct apartments.  Garrison brought a 4th Amendment claim because they did not have a warrant to search his apartment, but rather they had a warrant to search McWebbs apartment, and Garrison wanted to use the 4th Amendment to suppress the drug evidence.

Opinion
The Court finds that because the warrant allowed for investigation of the 3rd floor, the officers reasonably relied on the warrant to carry out the search.  Therefore the evidence is allowed, and Garrison is not allowed to invoke the 4th Amendment protection.

See also
 List of United States Supreme Court cases
 Lists of United States Supreme Court cases by volume
 List of United States Supreme Court cases, volume 480
 List of United States Supreme Court cases by the Rehnquist Court

Further reading

External links

United States Supreme Court cases
United States Supreme Court cases of the Rehnquist Court
United States Fourth Amendment case law
1987 in United States case law
Baltimore Police Department